Rhodomicrobium vannielii is a Gram-negative, purple non-sulfur, motile, thermophilic photoheterotroph bacterium. Phototrophic bacteria are ubiquitous and have been reportedly found in many marine and terrestrial ecosystems. Additionally, they can use light as an energy source and carbon dioxide as a carbon source. Considering this, R. vannielii is thought to have potential application in anaerobic treatment and bioremediation under high temperature conditions as the bacteria was isolated from water samples from a hot spring in Gadek, Malacca, Malaysia using glutamate-malate medium (GMM) and Pfennig's M2 medium.  R. vannielii produces acyclic and aliphatic cyclic carotenoids like anhydrorhodovibrin, rhodovibrin, spirilloxanthin and rhodopin.

Microbiologic characteristics

Morphology 
Mature R. vannielii cells are typically ovoid to spherical in shape, do not form intracellular sulfur globules, and are about 2.0-2.5 μm long and 1.2-1.5 μm wide. The cells are then attached by means of  slender  branched  filaments,  with  the  connecting  filaments  varying  in  length,  but  a  uniform diameter  of approximately  0.3  microns.  Colonies  are  irregular  in  shape,  and  have  a  rough, convoluted surface. After observation, the cells showed a budding filament formation. R. vannielli is unique as it is the only species of its genus to reproduce via budding rather than fission.

Pigmentation 
R. vannielii contains carotenoid pigments, which gives its cultures a salmon-pink to a deep orange-red color, depending on the density of growth. Optimum carotenoid production was achieved after the culture spent  24  hours  in  GMM  without  yeast-extract  and  having  been  incubated  in  anaerobic-light condition at a light intensity of 2000 lux. R. vannielii’s growth rate was measured as optical density at a wavelength of 660 nm.

Metabolism 
R. vannielii is an anoxygenic bacteria, meaning it uses light as an energy source and converts it into ATP without the production of oxygen as a byproduct of the reaction. R. vannielii grows better in anaerobic-light conditions compared to  growth in aerobic-dark. This growth shows that cells are capable of also growing chemoheterophically in the dark, meaning it can derive its energy from chemical energy sources as well as from sunlight. However, the microbe cannot use carbon dioxide as its sole carbon source, but requires other compounds from the environment to meet their carbon requirements. R. vannielii is able to utilize acetate, lactate, pyruvate, citrate and succinate as a carbon source. However, cell growth and carotenoid production is highest when succinate or acetate is used as substrate after 48-hours of incubation.

Environment 
Water samples were first isolated from Gadek Hot Spring in Malacca, Malaysia, at a depth of 0.8-1.4 m from the water surface using an extendable metal sampler. The water samples were isolated  on  two media:  (i)  glutamate-malate medium (GMM), and (ii) Pfennig’s M2 medium. All inoculated bottles were incubated using  60 W (Morries) tungsten  lamps at  2000 lux light intensity of continuous illumination with a temperature ranging between 38-40 °C. After 7 days of incubation, the GMM media changed color from transparent yellow to red. Growth in the M2 medium, however, was slower as pink to light red color appeared after more than 10 days incubation. It was found that R. vannielii’s temperature optima was approximately 50 °C to 58 °C, while its pH optima ranged from 6.8 to 7.3. The microorganism’s optimum light intensity for carotenoid production was 2000 lux.

Phenotypic and genetic characteristics 
On average, R. vannielii’s genome size is approximately 400 base pairs, is motile, stains Gram-negative, and has a G+C content of 62.2%.

In 1949, it was debated on whether R. vannielii was to be placed in the genus Rhodospirillum or Rhodopseudomonas because  the  photoheterotrophs  were  all  closely related  morphologically. However, subsequent studies of the physiology and morphology of several  pure R.  vannielii cultures  have  led  researchers  to  create  a  new  genus  for  this  organism: Rhodomicrobium. This name was chosen to honor Professor C. B. van Niel as his studies of R. vannielii heavily contributed to what is currently known regarding the group of microorganisms.

References

Further reading

External links 
Type strain of Rhodomicrobium vannielii at BacDive -  the Bacterial Diversity Metadatabase

Hyphomicrobiales
Bacteria described in 1949